Basalia nilgiroides is a moth of the family Erebidae first described by Michael Fibiger in 2008. It is known from the Nilgiri Hills of south-central India.

Adults have been recorded in April.

The wingspan is about 13 mm. The forewing is long, pointed and brownish and grey. The crosslines are broad and black by the costa. The terminal line is marked by black interveinal dots. The hindwing is light greyish and the fringes are whitish. The underside is beige and hindwing whitish, with an indistinct discal spot.

References

Micronoctuini
Moths described in 2008